Network Investigative Technique, or NIT, is a form of malware (or hacking) employed by the FBI since at least 2002. It is a drive-by download computer program designed to provide access to a computer.

Controversies
Its usage has raised both Fourth Amendment concerns and jurisdictional issues. The FBI has to date, despite a court order, declined to provide the complete code in a child sex abuse case involving the Tor anonymity network. On May 12, 2016 Mozilla filed an amicus curiae brief inasmuch as the FBI's exploit against the Mozilla Firefox  web browsers potentially puts millions of users at risk. It asked that the exploit be told to them before it is told to the defendant, thus raising Fifth Amendment issues as well. Also, US District Judge Robert J. Bryan in Tacoma, Washington has ruled that while the defendant in United States v. Michaud has the right to review the code, the government also has the right to keep it secret (two other federal judges in related cases have ruled to suppress evidence found as a result of the NIT); On May 25, 2016, however, he ruled that "For the reasons stated orally on the record, evidence of the NIT., the search warrant issued based on the NIT., and the fruits of that warrant should be excluded and should not be offered in evidence at trial..."

In March 2017 the American Civil Liberties Union, Electronic Frontier Foundation, and the National Association of Criminal Defense Lawyers released a 188-page guide to enable meaningful 4th Amendment analysis. In April a Minnesota judge ruled  that the warrant was invalid from the moment it was signed, given that the FBI agent knew that it exceed the jurisdictional requirements of Rule 41. All evidence gathered after that warrant was served was hence the fruit of the poison tree.

See also
 Computer and Internet Protocol Address Verifier
 Operation Pacifier
 Operation Torpedo

References

External links
Playpen affidavit
Ferrell warrant describing some aspects of NIT
Mozilla amicus curiae

Computer security exploits
Digital forensics software
Federal Bureau of Investigation